Dead Ahead: The Exxon Valdez Disaster is a 1992 movie depicting the Exxon Valdez oil spill disaster off the coast of Alaska. Directed by Paul Seed, it stars Christopher Lloyd, John Heard, Rip Torn and Michael Murphy.

Most of the film was shot in Vancouver, Richmond and Steveston, British Columbia, but it also utilizes archival film clips of the actual disaster and cleanup efforts.

Synopsis
On March 24, 1989, the Exxon Valdez oil tanker struck a reef in Prince William Sound, Alaska.

Much of the film centers on the conflict between local officials, the fishing industry, and the Exxon official sent out to oversee the clean-up and take the rap. The filmmakers point out that much of the aftermath could have been minimized had the officials in charge been better prepared and not spent so much time involved in useless red-tape and petty bureaucratic bickering.

External links

1992 in the environment
1992 television films
1992 films
1990s disaster films
1992 drama films
Exxon Valdez oil spill
Disaster films based on actual events
Disaster television films
Environmental films
HBO Films films
Films set in Alaska
Films set in 1989
1990s English-language films